João Paulo Costa Cabreira (born 12 May 1982) is a Portuguese former cyclist.

Major results

2004
1st  Road race, National Under-23 Road Championships
1st Overall Volta a Portugal do Futuro
1st Stage 4
2006
1st Overall Volta ao Algarve
1st Stage 5
1st Stage 7 Volta a Portugal
2008
1st  Road race, National Road Championships
2009
1st Stage 5 Volta a Portugal
3rd Overall Troféu Joaquim Agostinho
1st Stage 2
2011
1st  Road race, National Road Championships

References

External links

1982 births
Living people
Portuguese male cyclists